Peppo is both a given name and a surname. Notable people with the name include:
Domingo Peppo (born 1958), Argentine politician
Peppo Biscarini (born 1960), Italian-American swimmer

Masculine given names